CHSC was a radio station in Unity, Saskatchewan, Canada which operated from 1923-1929.

History
Horace Stovin  launched the radio station in 1923 as 10AT and changed its callsign to CHSC in 1924. The frequencies CHSC operated on in Unity are unknown.

Stovin closed down CHSC in 1929 and moved to Regina to organize Plaiunsman Broadcasters and sign a management agreement contract to operate CKCK Regina for the owner, the Leader-Post newspaper.

The CHSC callsign has no relation to CHSC, a later defunct radio station in St. Catharines, Ontario.

References

External links

HSC
Hsc
Radio stations established in 1923
Radio stations disestablished in 1929
1923 establishments in Saskatchewan
1929 disestablishments in Saskatchewan
HSC